Sebastian Stahl (born 20 September 1978) is a German racing driver. He is the stepbrother of former Formula One drivers Ralf Schumacher and seven-time Formula One World Champion Michael Schumacher.

Stahl raced in the VLN endurance series at the Nürburgring and the 24 Hours Nürburgring for "Airnergy-Motorsport", driving a BMW M3 GT with Kenneth Heyer.

He drove for A1 Grand Prix's A1 Team Germany at the 2006 season finale in China.

External links 
 
 Official website
 FIA GT driver page
 https://web.archive.org/web/20040730003120/http://www.airnergy-motorsport.de/

1978 births
A1 Team Germany drivers
German racing drivers
Living people
Sportspeople from Bonn
Racing drivers from North Rhine-Westphalia
Porsche Supercup drivers
Eurocup Mégane Trophy drivers
European Touring Car Championship drivers
Sebastian

A1 Grand Prix drivers
Super Nova Racing drivers
Nürburgring 24 Hours drivers